Lakhandur Taluka is a Taluka in Sakoli subdivision of Bhandara district in Maharashtra State of India.

Demographics 
As per Indian government census of 2011, the population was 123573.

Geographic Boundaries

References 

Talukas in Maharashtra
Bhandara district